Higganum is a village and census-designated place (CDP) in the town of Haddam, a part of Middlesex County, Connecticut, United States. The population was 2,089 at the 2020 census.

History
The name "Higganum" is derived from an Indian name meaning either "at the tomahawk rock" or "Great Bend in River".

At about 1800, Higganum Center was the area of most economic activity in the town. The neighborhood had abundant water power, and Higganum Landing on the Connecticut River formed a natural cove that served as a river port and shipbuilding center from the late 1700s through the mid-1800s. Scovil Hoe Company, which made hoes that helped till soil for crops that included cotton and tobacco, once had a major factory based in Higganum.  Higganum Landing Historic District has been listed on the National Register of Historic Places since 2018. 

Higganum now encompasses the town's traditional center and remains the shopping and civic center for Haddam. It has a center green with a veterans' memorial, Shad museum, a youth center and a gazebo. The center has a "feed store", one bank, a post office, two liquor stores, a barbershop, dry cleaners, restaurants, Dunkin' Donuts, and an ice cream shop.

Geography
Higganum lies on the southwest banks of the Connecticut River and is found immediately south of Middletown. Geographical landmarks include Candlewood Hill, Candlewood Brook, Seven Falls and Bible Rock.

Demographics
As of the census of 2000, there were 1,671 people, 673 households, and 495 families living in the CDP.  The population density was 132.5/km (343.4/mi2).  There were 698 housing units at an average density of 55.3/km (143.4/mi2).  The racial makeup of the CDP was 97.19% White, 1.08% African American, 0.12% Native American, 0.66% Asian, 0.12% from other races, and 0.84% from two or more races. Hispanic or Latino of any race were 0.96% of the population.

There were 673 households, out of which 30.6% had children under the age of 18 living with them, 62.4% were married couples living together, 8.0% had a female householder with no husband present, and 26.4% were non-families. 21.5% of all households were made up of individuals, and 9.1% had someone living alone who was 65 years of age or older.  The average household size was 2.48 and the average family size was 2.89.

In the CDP the population was spread out, with 22.4% under the age of 18, 5.3% from 18 to 24, 31.1% from 25 to 44, 28.8% from 45 to 64, and 12.4% who were 65 years of age or older.  The median age was 41 years. For every 100 females, there were 96.6 males.  For every 100 females age 18 and over, there were 93.3 males.

The median income for a household in the CDP was $60,405, and the median income for a family was $80,998. Males had a median income of $48,125 versus $36,131 for females. The per capita income for the CDP was $31,238.  About 1.5% of families and 3.9% of the population were below the poverty line, including 4.3% of those under age 18 and 9.6% of those age 65 or over.

Education
Higganum is home to Haddam Killingworth High School (HKHS) and Burr District Elementary (BDES).

Notes

Census-designated places in Middlesex County, Connecticut
Haddam, Connecticut
Connecticut populated places on the Connecticut River
Villages in Connecticut
Villages in Middlesex County, Connecticut